Verquin is a commune in the Pas-de-Calais department in the Hauts-de-France region of France.

Geography
The A26 autoroute passes through the middle of the commune.

Population

Places of interest
 The church of St. Amé, dating from the sixteenth century.
 The war memorial.
 The Commonwealth War Graves Commission cemetery.

See also
Communes of the Pas-de-Calais department

References

External links

 www.ville-verquin.fr
 The CWGC graves in the commune’s cemetery

Communes of Pas-de-Calais